Tianxia Changhe is a 2022 Chinese historical television series written and directed by Zhang Ting, and starring Luo Jin,  and Huang Zhizhong. The series aired on Hunan Television from November 11 to December 1, 2022.

Cast

Main
 Luo Jin as Kangxi Emperor of the Qing Empire.

Supporting
 Xi Meijuan as Empress Dowager Xiaozhuang, grandmother of Kangxi Emperor.
 Liang Guanhua as Songgotu, a senior official of the Qing court, political opponent of Mingju.
  as Mingju, a senior official of the Qing court, political opponent of Songgotu.
 Su Ke as Yu Chenglong, an official of the Qing court.
 Lu Siyu as Gao Shiqi, a favourite courtier of Kangxi Emperor.
 Li Xinzhe as Jin Zhiyu, an official of the Qing court, a close ally of Songgotu.

Soundtrack

Production
The script has been revised many times by director Zhang Ting since it was created ten years ago. Tianxia Changhe began production on 7 September 2021 in Hengdian World Studios and finished filming on 8 January 2022 in Inner Mongolia.

Reception
Douban, a major Chinese media rating site, gave the series 8.2 out of 10.

References

External links
 

Television series set in the Qing dynasty
2022 Chinese television series debuts
2022 Chinese television series endings
Chinese historical television series